"Gang Gang" (stylized in all caps) is a song by American rappers Polo G and Lil Wayne. It was released as a single on May 21, 2021, as the fourth single from Polo's third studio album, Hall of Fame.  The song was written by the two artists and produced by Angelo Ferraro.

Charts

Certifications

Release history

References

2021 singles
2021 songs
Polo G songs
Lil Wayne songs
Songs written by Lil Wayne